The North Hampton Town Hall is located at 231 Atlantic Avenue in North Hampton, New Hampshire. Built in 1844, it was the town's first purpose-built municipal building, and continues to be used as such. Its construction includes materials recovered from older dual-purpose religious and civic buildings, and its tower houses a Revere bell. The building was listed on the National Register of Historic Places in 2013, and the New Hampshire State Register of Historic Places in 2006.

Description and history
The North Hampton Town Hall stands amid a cluster of civic buildings on the north side of Atlantic Avenue (New Hampshire Route 111), a short way east of its junction with Lafayette Road (U.S. Route 1). It is a single-story white clapboarded building with a two-stage tower, in which hangs an 1816 Revere bell. The tower's pyramidal roof and clock were added in 1920. The building corners have Greek Revival pilasters, which rise to an entablature and a fully pedimented gable. At the center of the gable is a half-oval fanlight in the Federal style. There is a single main entrance, placed at the center of the front facade, with sash windows on either side. Both the windows and entrance are trimmed by narrower Federal-style moulding.

The structure was built in 1844 to serve the town's municipal needs, a function it continues to serve today. In addition to the bell, which originally hung in the town's second meetinghouse, the building includes timbers from meetinghouses built in 1734 and 1761.

See also
National Register of Historic Places listings in Rockingham County, New Hampshire

References

City and town halls on the National Register of Historic Places in New Hampshire
Greek Revival architecture in New Hampshire
Government buildings completed in 1844
Buildings and structures in Rockingham County, New Hampshire
City and town halls in New Hampshire
National Register of Historic Places in Rockingham County, New Hampshire
New Hampshire State Register of Historic Places
North Hampton, New Hampshire